The 2019–20 Israeli Basketball Premier League, for sponsorship reasons Ligat Winner, was the 66th season of the Israeli Basketball Premier League. On 13 March 2020, the league was suspended because of the COVID-19 pandemic. The league resumed behind closed doors on 21 June 2020 in a different format.

Teams

Maccabi Haifa has been promoted to the league after winning 2018–19 Liga Leumit after they won Hapoel Galil Elyon 3–1 in the Series Finals, and comes back just one year after their relegation. Meanwhile, Bnei Herzliya was relegated after finishing in the last place the previous season
.

Stadia and locations

Personnel and sponsorship

Managerial changes

Regular season

Rounds 1 to 22

Top-teams League Group

Positions by round

Bottom-Teams League Group

Positions by round

Playoffs
The first round of the playoffs is played in a best-of-three format, with the higher seeded team playing the first (and the second at  home if is necessary).

|}

Final Four

Bracket

Semifinals

Final

Awards

MVP of the Round

Monthly Awards

Player of the Month

Israeli Player of the Month

Coach of the Month

Israeli clubs in European competitions

 Bold – still active.
 Strike – Season canceled due to the COVID-19 pandemic.

See also
2019–20 Israeli Basketball National League
2019–20 Israeli Basketball State Cup
2019 Israeli Basketball League Cup

References

 
Israeli Basketball Premier League seasons
Israeli
Basketball